Sebastiano Scarcella (born 25 November 1925) is an Italian rector and jurist.

Life
Rector of the Università degli Studi Niccolò Cusano from 2006 to November 2010.

He is honorary President of the Council of State (Italy).

Scarcella is presidente of the Fondazione Niccolò Cusano.

Books
Commento giuridico-sistematico dei decreti delegati sulla scuola, editore Rivista di diritto scolastico, 1979 (con Giovanni Trainito)
Lo stato giuridico del personale della scuola: commento giuridico-sistematico del decreto delegato 31 maggio 1974, N. 417, Volume 2, editore Rivista di diritto scolastico, 1975 (con Giovanni Trainito)

See also
Università degli Studi Niccolò Cusano
Fondazione Niccolò Cusano
Italian Council of State

References

External links
University Niccolò Cusano
 Fondazione Niccolò Cusano

1925 births
Living people
Italian male writers
Università degli Studi Niccolò Cusano rectors